Pran is considered one of the most versatile character actor of bollywood till date. Throughout his career he has played amazing memory grappling roles of all time. He was a natural actor. Has got paid even more than the lead heroes in many movies during his time which depicts his persona and importance in the film industry.
 

This is the filmography for the Indian actor Pran. He acted in 362 films.

1940s

1950s

1960s

1970s

1980s

1990s

2000s

References

External links
 Filmography at Pran's official website
 

Indian filmographies
Male actor filmographies